"With Love" is a song by the Georgian-Greek singer Tamta. The song was Tamta's entry in a three-way race with Christos Dantis and Sarbel to be Greece's entry in the Eurovision Song Contest 2007. On February 28, 2007, Greece chose Sarbel's "Yassou Maria".

National final
Tamta chose to sing the "With Love", a ballad composed by the Eurovision veteran Nikos Terzis. Lyrics were by Posidonas Giannopoulos. The ballad was of ethnic style containing Greek elements as well as others. A part of the song was in Greek. Tamta went on stage with two male dancers and had a stage act with pyrotechnics. She wore a white dress with while glove and a white hood. The background was orange-yellow.  The male dancers used red ribbon-flags on stage. The video wall in the background showed the words "love" and "happiness" in different languages. The performance suffered a microphone glitch mid-way when one of the dancers stepped on a wire.

Track listing 
CD promo
 "With Love" (Demo Version)

CD single
 "With Love" – 3:00
 "With Love" (Soul Spirit Mix) – 4:01

Charts

See also
Greece in the Eurovision Song Contest 2007

References

2007 singles
English-language Greek songs
Greek-language songs
Tamta songs
Songs written by Nikos Terzis
2007 songs
EMI Records singles